The Wilerhorn is a mountain of the Bernese Oberland in Switzerland. It lies to the south-east of the Höch Gumme and to the north-west of the Brünig Pass. It should not be confused with the Wilerhorn that is in the Bernese Alps but the canton of Valais.

Administratively, the summit is shared between the municipalities of Lungern, to the north and east, Hofstetten bei Brienz, to the west, and Brienzwiler, to the south. Hofstetten bei Brienz and Brienzwiler are in the canton of Bern, whilst Lungern is in the canton of Obwalden.

References

External links
 Wilerhorn on Hikr

Mountains of the Alps
Mountains of Switzerland
Mountains of the canton of Bern
Mountains of Obwalden
Emmental Alps
Bern–Obwalden border
Two-thousanders of Switzerland